In the leadup to the 2019 federal election, a number of polling companies conducted regular opinion polls for various news organisations. These polls collected data on party's primary vote, and contained an estimation of the two-party-preferred vote. They also asked questions about views of the electorate about the major party leaders.

Graphical summary

Voting intention

Preferred prime minister, and satisfaction

See also
2019 Australian federal election
Electorate opinion polling for the 2019 Australian federal election

References

Opinion polling, national
2019